Field Marshal Frederick Rudolph Lambart, 10th Earl of Cavan,  (16 October 1865 – 28 August 1946), known as Viscount Kilcoursie from 1887 until 1900, was a British Army officer and Chief of the Imperial General Staff. He served in the Second Boer War, led XIV Corps during the First World War, and later advised the Government on the implementation of the Geddes report, which advocated a large reduction in defence expenditure; he presided over a major reduction in the size of the British Army.

Early career
Born into an aristocratic family of Anglo-Irish descent, he was the son of the 9th Earl of Cavan and Mary Sneade Lambart (née Olive). He was educated at Eton College, Christ Church, Oxford, and the Royal Military College, Sandhurst; Lambart was commissioned into the Grenadier Guards on 29 August 1885. He gained the courtesy title of Viscount Kilcoursie in 1887 when his father succeeded to the Earldom and was appointed Aide-de-Camp to the Governor General of Canada in 1891.

He was promoted to captain on 16 October 1897, after he had been appointed regimental adjutant on 25 August 1897, a position he held until 17 March 1900. By then, the Grenadier Guards were involved in the Second Boer War in South Africa. He saw action as a company commander in the Battle of Biddulphsberg in May 1900, and, having succeeded to his father's titles on 14 July 1900, took part in operations against the Boers in 1901 and was mentioned in despatches. Following the end of the war in June 1902, he left Cape Town on the SS Sicilia and returned to Southampton in late July.

After promotion to major on 28 October 1902, he became second-in-command of 2nd Battalion Grenadier Guards in July 1905. He was promoted again to lieutenant colonel and appointed Commanding Officer of 2nd Battalion Grenadier Guards on 14 February 1908. Appointed a Member of the Royal Victorian Order Fourth Class on 29 June 1910 and promoted to colonel on 4 October 1911, he retired from the British Army on 8 November 1913 and became Master of Foxhounds for the Hertfordshire Hunt. At that time he lived at Wheathampstead House in Wheathampstead.

First World War
He was recalled at the start of the First World War and was appointed commanding officer of the 4th (Guards) Brigade on 11 August 1914 and went on to lead the Brigade at the First Battle of Ypres in October 1914. Appointed a Companion of the Order of the Bath on 18 February 1915, he also led the Brigade at the Battle of Festubert in May 1915.

Cavan was promoted to major general and given command of the 50th (Northumbrian) Division on 29 June 1915; a mere two months later he was appointed the first commander of the Guards Division and, having been appointed Commander of the French Legion of Honour on 10 September 1915, he led his Division at the Battle of Loos later that month. He was elected a representative peer from Ireland on 24 September 1915 and as such was one of the last to be so elected before the creation of the Irish Free State. In his role as Commander of the Guards Division he informed Major Winston Churchill of the latter's attachment to the 2nd Battalion of the Grenadiers in November 1915.

The following January 1916, Cavan was placed at the head of XIV Corps and took part in the Battle of the Somme that Summer. He was made a Grand Officer of the Belgian Order of the Crown on 2 November 1916 and appointed a Knight of the Order of St Patrick on 18 November 1916.

Promoted to lieutenant general on 1 January 1917, he led his Corps at the Battle of Passchendaele in Summer 1917. He was awarded the rank of Grand Officer of the Legion of Honour on 25 September 1917 and was redeployed with his Corps to Italy in October 1917. Advanced to Knight Commander of the Order of the Bath on 1 January 1918, Cavan was appointed Commander-in-Chief of the British Forces in Italy on 10 March 1918.

After reverses on the Western Front in March and April 1918, Prime Minister Lloyd George and the War Cabinet had been keen to remove Field Marshal Sir Douglas Haig as Commander-in-Chief of the BEF, but had been unable to think of a suitable successor. In July Cavan was summoned to London, supposedly to discuss the Italian Front but in reality, as Cabinet Secretary Maurice Hankey put it, "to 'vet' him with a view to his replacing Haig" Hankey claimed to have dissuaded the Prime Minister by pointing to Cavan's lack of ideas as to how to defeat the Austro-Hungarians. Haig's victory at Amiens in August secured his position.

On the Italian Front Cavan led the Tenth Army which struck a decisive blow at the Battle of Vittorio Veneto, the action that sounded the final death knell of the Austro-Hungarian Army towards the close of the war.

Following the end of the war the King of Italy awarded him the War Cross for Military Valor and made him a Commander, and subsequently a Grand Officer, of the Military Order of Savoy as well as appointing him a Grand Officer of the Order of St Maurice and St Lazarus. Cavan was also appointed a Knight Grand Cross of the Order of St Michael and St George for his contribution to operations in Italy, awarded the American Distinguished Service Medal and appointed to the Chinese Order of Wen-Hu (1st Class).

Postwar

His first appointment after the war was when he became lieutenant of the Tower of London on 22 March 1920. Appointed Aide-de-Camp General to the King on 1 October 1920, he became General Officer Commanding at Aldershot Command on 2 November 1920 before being promoted to general on 2 November 1921.

He was appointed Chief of the Imperial General Staff on 19 February 1922. He may have been chosen as a steady man, the antithesis of his predecessor Henry Wilson, whose relations with the government had deteriorated, and who was in Wilson's view more likely to agree to withdraw troops from Egypt and India. CIGS Cavan advised the Government on the implementation of the Geddes report, which advocated a large reduction in defence expenditure, and he officiated over a major reduction in the size of the British Army. Earl Cavan made a famous speech at the 'Royal Academy Banquet' to his equals in government and fellow peers and royalty. Advanced to Knight Grand Cross of the Order of the Bath in the New Year Honours 1926, he retired on 19 February 1926.

He was also colonel of the Irish Guards from 23 May 1925 and colonel of the Bedfordshire and Hertfordshire Regiment from 10 December 1928.

In May 1927, he accompanied the Duke and Duchess of York to Australia to open the Provisional Parliament House at Canberra, for which he was appointed a Knight Grand Cross of the Civil Division of the Order of the British Empire on 8 July 1927. He became Captain of the Honourable Corps of Gentlemen-at-Arms on 23 July 1929 and was promoted to field marshal on 31 October 1932. He also took part in the procession for the funeral of King George V in January 1936 and commanded the troops at the procession for the coronation of King George VI on 12 May 1937.

During the Second World War he served as Commanding Officer of the Hertfordshire Local Defence Volunteers. He died at the London Clinic in Devonshire Place in London on 28 August 1946.

He was buried in the family plot at the churchyard in Ayot St Lawrence, where a seven-foot-tall red granite cross is his headstone. His is the churchyard's only burial registered as Commonwealth war grave.

Marriage and family
He married on 1 August 1893 to Caroline Inez Crawley (1870–1920), daughter of George Baden Crawley and Eliza Inez Hulbert, at Digswell Church in Digswell, Hertfordshire. She predeceased her husband; they had no children.

He married, secondly, on 27 November 1922 to Lady Hester Joan Byng, daughter of Reverend Francis Byng, 5th Earl of Strafford and Emily Georgina Kerr, at St. Mark's Church in North Audley Street, Mayfair, London. His second wife was the niece of his army colleague Field Marshal Byng, who was a younger half-brother of the 5th Earl of Strafford. Hester, Countess of Cavan, would, in 1927, be appointed a Dame Commander of the Order of the British Empire. The couple had two daughters:

Lady Elizabeth Mary Lambart (16 October 1924 – 8 December 2016), married in 1949 to Mark Frederic Kerr Longman, President of the Longman Group Ltd, had issue. She was in 1947 one of the eight bridesmaids in Princess Elizabeth's marriage to Lieutenant Philip Mountbatten. Her granddaughter is Rose Cholmondeley, Marchioness of Cholmondeley.
Lady Joanna Lambart

As he had no son, the 10th Earl was succeeded by his brother, Horace.

References

External links

 The Papers of Field Marshal Lord Cavan held at Churchill Archives Centre
 Frederick Lambart, 10th Earl of Cavan (1865–1946), Field Marshal (National Portrait Gallery, 16 portraits)

|-

|-

1865 births
1946 deaths
People from Ayot St Lawrence
Burials at Ayot St Lawrence
Military personnel from London
People educated at Eton College
Graduates of the Royal Military College, Sandhurst
Alumni of Christ Church, Oxford
Deputy Lieutenants of Hertfordshire
Irish representative peers
Knights of St Patrick
Grand Croix of the Légion d'honneur
Knights Grand Cross of the Order of the British Empire
Knights Grand Cross of the Order of the Bath
Knights Grand Cross of the Order of St Michael and St George
Knights Grand Cross of the Royal Victorian Order
Knights Grand Cross of the Order of Saints Maurice and Lazarus
Masters of foxhounds in England
Recipients of the Order of the Cross of Liberty
Foreign recipients of the Distinguished Service Medal (United States)
Recipients of the Croix de Guerre (France)
Grand Officers of the Military Order of Savoy
British Army personnel of the Second Boer War
British Army generals of World War I
Italian front (World War I)
British field marshals
Chiefs of the Imperial General Staff
Grenadier Guards officers
Honourable Corps of Gentlemen at Arms
Earls of Cavan
Recipients of the Distinguished Service Medal (US Army)
Military personnel from Hertfordshire